Pareutetrapha is a genus of longhorn beetles of the subfamily Lamiinae, containing the following species:

 Pareutetrapha eximia (Bates, 1884)
 Pareutetrapha magnifica (Schwarzer, 1925)
 Pareutetrapha nigromaculata Breuning, 1952
 Pareutetrapha olivacea Breuning, 1952
 Pareutetrapha simulans (Bates, 1873)
 Pareutetrapha sylvia Gressitt, 1951

References

Saperdini